Abdirahman Abdi Mohamed is a Somali politician. He is the Deputy Minister of Foreign Affairs of Somalia, having been appointed to the position on 25 October 2014 by Prime Minister Abdiweli Sheikh Ahmed.

References

Living people
Government ministers of Somalia
Year of birth missing (living people)